Prof. Dr.Shivakant Ojha is an Indian politician affiliated with Bhartiya Janata Party. He is member of Uttar Pradesh Legislative Assembly representing Raniganj constituency in Pratapgarh district, of Uttar Pradesh. On 18 January 2014, Prof. Ojha was assigned as Minister for Technical Education in Akhilesh Yadav's cabinet. He was removed as the Minister for Technical Education on 29 October by the Chief Minister of the state, Akhilesh Yadav. Later he was reinducted in the cabinet again as a Health Minister of the state on 26 September 2016. He was minister in Kalyan singh cabinet.
He was minister for 9 years.
He won election 4 times and 3 times in a row.

Early life and education 
He lives in Ramaiyapur village, post Prithviganj in Pratapgarh, Uttar Pradesh. He is post graduate in Master of Arts from Allahabad University in 1973 and did Master of Philosophy from Meerut University in 1986. By profession, he teaches in college.

Political career 
He was MLA from Raniganj constituency of Pratapgarh district, Uttar Pradesh from 2012–2016. He won 2012 Uttar Pradesh Assembly Election with 38.96% votes gain. On 18 January 2012, Ojha was assigned as minister in Akhilesh Yadav’s cabinet. He was formerly affiliated with Bhartiya Janata Party and Bahujan Samaj Party. He unsuccessfully contested 2009 Lok Sabha elections on the ticket of BSP,> defeated by Rajkumari Ratna Singh.

References

Living people
People from Pratapgarh, Uttar Pradesh
Samajwadi Party politicians
1951 births
Bharatiya Janata Party politicians from Uttar Pradesh
Bahujan Samaj Party politicians from Uttar Pradesh